The Opus Imaging Research Building is a Mayo Clinic building in Rochester, Minnesota, United States. Groundbreaking ceremonies took place on March 22, 2006, with help of a $7 million donation from The Opus Group for the foundation of this medical imaging facility. The National Institutes of Health also donated to the sum of a $2.4 million capital grant. The building houses imaging research such as high-resolution MRIs and detailed scans of brains for studies of Alzheimer's disease and other afflictions.

References

Mayo Clinic buildings